Juan Gisbert and Manuel Orantes were the defending champions, but they fell in the first round.
Brian Gottfried and Raúl Ramírez claimed the title and $7,000 first-prize money following victory over Fred McNair and Sherwood Stewart in the final.

Seeds
A champion seed is indicated in bold text while text in italics indicates the round in which that seed was eliminated.

Draw

Finals

Top half

Bottom half

References

External links

U.S. Clay Court Championships
1976 U.S. Clay Court Championships